René van Eck (born 18 February 1966) is a Dutch former professional footballer who works as Ludovic Magnin's assistant at Swiss Super League side FC Zürich.

Playing career

Club
Van Eck started his professional career at local side Excelsior Rotterdam before moving to FC Den Bosch aged 20. The long-haired defender played four seasons at Den Bosch, then moved abroad to join FC Luzern where he would spend eight seasons and become captain of the team.

He was a hard and physical defender, moving in December 1998 from FC Luzern to 1. FC Nürnberg. He played with Nürnberg sixteen games the Bundesliga. After Nürnberg's relegation he played one season in the 2. Bundesliga with 22 games. Afterwards, Van Eck moved back to Switzerland and signed a contract with FC Winterthur. After half a  year he moved to league rival SC Kriens.

Coaching career 
His coaching career began for Van Eck as assistant manager of FC Luzern; in 2003 he was named as the new manager. His greatest success was the promotion to the Swiss Super League, among others with 31 games without defeat. Differences with the club management led him to leave Luzern and joining the Finnish club Inter Turku. With this club he stayed in the league. From June 2007 to May 2008 he managed FC Thun and was relegated from the AXPO Super League to the Challenge League, and on 23 May 2008 fired in Thun.

Since 2007, van Eck holds the UEFA Pro Coach Licence. He signed a coaching contract with FC Carl Zeiss Jena on 28 September 2008, until the end of the season, then on 5 February 2009 extended his contract to 30 June 2011. He was fired from his coaching job with Carl Zeiss Jena on 24 March 2009. On 29 May 2009, it was announced that he would return to Carl Zeiss Jena because his not cancelled contract ran until 30 June 2011. Later he was named as the new head coach of Carl Zeiss Jena, returning after 67 days. On 1 June 2010, he canceled his contract with Carl Zeiss Jena and left the club. During his time at Carl Zeiss Jena, "players were asked to toughen up by learning fighting techniques."

On 5 February 2015, FC Den Bosch announced that Rene van Eck would lead the first team for the rest of the 2014–15 season. This would have Rene van Eck returning in the Vliert after 24 years. He was removed from his job as a manager on 6 February 2016, after the 3–2 loss in the cup at home against VVSB.

He returned to Switzerland to take the reins at FC Muri in May 2016 and took over again in April 2017 after a spell at German side Wacker Nordhausen.

Personal life
His brother Jos also played professional football in Holland.

References 

1966 births
Living people
Footballers from Rotterdam
Association football central defenders
Dutch footballers
Excelsior Rotterdam players
FC Den Bosch players
FC Luzern players
1. FC Nürnberg players
FC Winterthur players
SC Kriens players
Eredivisie players
Bundesliga players
2. Bundesliga players
Swiss Super League players
Swiss Challenge League players
Dutch expatriate footballers
Expatriate footballers in Germany
Expatriate footballers in Switzerland
Dutch expatriate sportspeople in Germany
Dutch expatriate sportspeople in Switzerland
Dutch football managers
FC Luzern managers
FC Inter Turku managers
FC Wohlen managers
FC Thun managers
FC Carl Zeiss Jena managers
Alemannia Aachen managers
FC Den Bosch managers
3. Liga managers
Dutch expatriate football managers
Expatriate football managers in Switzerland
Expatriate football managers in Finland
Expatriate football managers in Germany
Dutch expatriate sportspeople in Finland